The lyrics for the anthem of the Barinas State, Venezuela, were written by Rafael Montenegro. The music was composed by Pedro Elías Gutiérrez. It was adopted by executive decree 27 January 1911.

Lyrics

See also
 List of anthems of Venezuela

Anthems of Venezuela
Spanish-language songs
Year of song missing